Mimleucania is a genus of moths of the family Noctuidae.

Species
 Mimleucania perstriata Hampson, 1909

References
Natural History Museum Lepidoptera genus database
Mimleucania at funet

Hadeninae